On 26 September 2022, a mass shooting occurred at a school in Izhevsk, Udmurtia, in west-central Russia. Eighteen people were killed and 23 others were wounded before the gunman, identified as Artem Kazantsev, committed suicide.

Events
The mass shooting occurred at School No. 88 in Izhevsk, Udmurtia, Russia at around 10:52 AM. Armed with two pistols and a large supply of ammunition, the gunman, Artem Kazantsev, entered the school and opened fire on several classrooms. Throughout the shooting, he burst through several classrooms and indiscriminately fired on those inside. The gunman then entered an empty classroom and shot himself in the head. Videos of the aftermath were posted by the investigative committee, which included images of the interior of the school and Kazantsev's body lying on the floor of the classroom.

Victims
Kazantsev killed 17 people at the school. The victims include 11 students aged 7 to 15 years, two security guards, two teachers, and two other adults. Twenty-four people were wounded, including 22 children. One of the injured, a 67-year-old woman, died on 8 November, increasing the death toll to 18.

Investigation
Investigators searched Kazantsev's residence and probed reports of his potential neo-fascist and neo-Nazi ideology after reports emerged that he was involved in a neo-fascist organization or group. The weapons used were found to be two "traumatic" pistols, a form of non-lethal firearm used by law enforcement that had been converted to fire live ammunition and obtained illegally. It was also braided with key chains honoring Columbine massacre perpetrators, Eric Harris and Dylan Klebold.

Perpetrator
According to the Investigative Committee, the shooter was 34-year-old Artem Kazantsev, born in 1988, a native of Izhevsk and a former student of the school. It was reported that he was wearing a T-shirt with Nazi symbols and a balaclava. According to the Head of Udmurtia Aleksandr Brechalov, Kazantsev was registered as an outpatient at a mental health facility with a diagnosis of schizophrenia.

According to an email written by Kazantsev 20 minutes prior to the shooting, the attack was not a terrorist incident.

Reactions
Kremlin Press Secretary Dmitry Peskov described the attack as "a terrorist act by a person who apparently belongs to a neo-fascist organisation or group".

Aleksandr Brechalov, the head of the Udmurt Republic, declared three days of mourning.

Words of condolences to the relatives of the victims and the injured were expressed by Russian president Vladimir Putin, Russian prime minister Mikhail Mishustin, and heads and representatives of the country's regions. Spontaneous memorials were organized in a number of cities of Russia and abroad.

The heads and representatives of foreign states and international organizations, including Xi Jinping, the United Nations, the European Union, the Egyptian Ministry of Foreign Affairs, and the U.S. Embassy in Russia expressed their condolences, as well as words of condemnation of the shooting.

See also 
 List of mass shootings in Russia
 Neo-Nazism in Russia
 Columbine effect

References

2022 murders in Russia
2022 mass shootings in Europe
2022 suicides
21st-century mass murder in Russia
Mass murder in 2022
September 2022 events in Russia
September 2022 crimes in Europe
Mass shootings in Russia
Murder–suicides in Europe
Neo-Nazism in Russia
School shootings in Russia
School killings in Russia
Columbine High School massacre copycat crimes
Suicides in Russia
School shooting
History of Udmurtia